is a Japanese politician of the Liberal Democratic Party, a member of the House of Representatives in the Diet (national legislature). A native of Meguro, Tokyo and graduate of the University of Tokyo, he had served in the assembly of Tokyo for four terms since 1965. He was elected to the House of Representatives for the first time in 1980 as a member of the New Liberal Club in 1980 after an unsuccessful run in 1979.

References

External links 
 Official website in Japanese.

1935 births
Living people
People from Meguro
University of Tokyo alumni
Members of the House of Representatives (Japan)
Education ministers of Japan
Japanese environmentalists
New Liberal Club politicians
Liberal Democratic Party (Japan) politicians
21st-century Japanese politicians